The enzyme fructose-2,6-bisphosphate 2-phosphatase ({EC 3.1.3.46) catalyzes the reaction

β-D-fructose 2,6-bisphosphate + H2O  D-fructose 6-phosphate + phosphate

This enzyme belongs to the family of hydrolases, specifically those acting on phosphoric monoester bonds.  The systematic name is β-D-fructose-2,6-bisphosphate 2-phosphohydrolase. Other names in common use include fructose-2,6-bisphosphatase, and D-fructose-2,6-bisphosphate 2-phosphohydrolase.  This enzyme participates in fructose and mannose metabolism.

Structural studies

References

 

EC 3.1.3
Enzymes of known structure